Venezia Santa Lucia  is the central station of Venice in the north-east of Italy. It is a terminus and located at the northern edge of Venice's historic city.
The station is one of Venice's two most important railway stations; the other one is Venezia Mestre, a mainline junction station on Venice's mainland district of Mestre. Both Santa-Lucia and Mestre stations are managed by Grandi Stazioni and they are connected to each other by Ponte della Libertà.

Location
Venezia Santa Lucia is located in Cannaregio district, the northernmost of the six historic sestieri (districts) of Venice's historic city. It is situated on the northernmost island and near the western end of the Grand Canal. The station lies at the  mark of the Milan–Venice railway.

A bridge over the Grand Canal, the Ponte degli Scalzi (or Ponte dei Scalzi), links the concourse in front of the station with the sestiere of Santa Croce.

Venice's historic city had access only by river boats or railway until 1933 (construction of the road bridge and of Piazzale Roma). Since then, a terminal has been built for road transport with car parks and bus stations.

History

Construction of Santa Lucia railway station began in 1860 under the Austrian Empire. In order to make room for both the station building and its forecourt, a convent and the Church of Santa Lucia were demolished in 1861. The station in turn took up the name of this church.

The current station building is one of the few modernist buildings facing the Grand Canal. It is the result of a series of plans started up by the rationalist architect Angiolo Mazzoni in 1924 and developed by him over the next decade.

In 1934, a contest for a detailed design for the current station was won by Virgilio Vallot. Between 1936 and 1943, Mazzoni and Vallot collaborated on the construction of the station building; Mazzoni also designed the train hall. The final implementation, however, was undertaken only after the Second World War. In 1952, the station was completed on a design which had been developed by another architect, Paul Perilli.

In November 2009, work began on the renovation of Santa Lucia station. The renovation programme would include improvements to the use of spaces and the flow of internal transit. In addition, certain architectural elements would be recovered and restored; the atrium would be altered to house several retail spaces. This project was completed in 2012 with a cost of 24 million euros.

Features
As the current station building is low and wide, it does not dominate its surroundings.  The flanks of its façade are decorated with Venetian lions.  Behind the façade, there is a sizeable main hall with ticketing facilities, shops, offices and luggage storage facilities.  The main hall also leads to the station's 16 platforms.

Train services
The station is served by the following services:

High-speed
 High-speed train (Trenitalia Frecciarossa) Venice-Salerno: Venice – Padua – Bologna – Florence – Rome – Naples – Salerno
 High-speed train (Italo NTV) Venice-Naples: Venice – Padua – Bologna – Florence – Rome – Naples
 High-speed train (Trenitalia Frecciarossa) Milan-Venice: Venice – Padua – Vicenza – Verona – Peschiera del Garda – Brescia – Milan
 High-speed train (Trenitalia Frecciarossa) Venice-Rome: Venice – Padua – Bologna – Florence – Rome
High-speed train (Trenitalia Frecciargento) Venice-Rome Airport: Venice – Padua – Ferrara – Bologna – Florence – Rome – Rome-Fiumicino "Leonard da Vinci" Airport
High-speed train (Trenitalia Frecciargento) Venice-Naples: Venice- Padua – Ferrara – Bologna – Florence – Rome – Naples
High-speed train (Trenitalia Frecciabianca) Turin-Venice: Venice – Padua – Vicenza – Verona – Peschiera del Garda – Brescia – Milan – Novara – Vercelli – Turin
High-speed train (Trenitalia Frecciabianca) Lecce-Venice: Lecce – Brindisi – Bari – Foggia – Termoli – Pescara – Ancona – Pesaro – Rimini – Bologna – Ferrara – Rovigo – Padua – Venice
Night train (Trenitalia Intercity Notte) Trieste-Rome: Trieste/Triest – Gorizia/Görz – Udine – Trevisio – Venice (Santa Lucia) – Venice (Mestre) – Padua – Monselice – Rovigo – Ferrara – Bologna – Arezzo – Chiusi-Chiciano Terme – Rome
Domestic
Regional train (Trenitalia Regional Express) Venice-Bologna: Venice – Padua – Monselice – Rovigo – Ferrara – Bologna
Regional train (Trenitalia Regional Express) Venice-Verona: Venice – Padua – Vicenza – San Bonifacio – Verona
Regional train (Trenitalia Regional) Venice-Verona: Venice – Mira Mirano – Padua – Grisignano di Zocco – Vicenza – San Bonifacio – Verona
Regional train (Trenitalia Regional) Venice-Udine: Venice – Treviso – Udine
Regional train (Trenitalia Regional) Venice-Conegliano: Venice – Treviso – Conegliano
Regional train (Trenitalia Regional) Venice-Portogruaro Caorle: Venice – Medolo – San Donà di Piave – Portogruaro Caorle
Regional train (Trenitalia Regional) Venice-Trieste: Venice – Portogruaro Carole – Monfalcone – Trieste/Triest
Regional train (Trenitalia Regional) Venice-Trieste via Gorizia: Venice – Treviso – Udine – Gorizia/Görz – Trieste/Triest
Regional train (Trenitalia Regional) Venice-Adria: Venice – Piove di Sacco – Adria
Regional train (Trenitalia Regional) Venice-Rovigo/Ferrara: Venice – Padua – Monselice – Rovigo – Ferrara
Regional train (Trenitalia Regional) Venice-Bassano del Grappa: Venice – Piombino Dese – Castelfranco Veneto – Bassano del Grappa
Cross-border

(D for Germany, A for Austria, F for France, CH for Switzerland, GB for United Kingdom)

On 11 December 2016, all ÖBB EuroNight services were rebranded as "Nightjet".
Intercity train (ÖBB Railjet) Venice-Vienna: Venice – Treviso – Udine – Tarvisio – Villach (A) – Klagenfurt (A) – Leoben (A) – Bruck (A) – Wiener Neustadt (A) – Vienna (A)
Intercity train (SBB CFF FFS Eurocity) Geneva-Venice: Geneva/Genf (CH) – Lausanne (CH) – Montreux (CH) – Sion (CH) – Brig (CH) – Domodossola – Gallarate – Milan – Brescia – Peschiera del Garda – Verona – Padua – Venice
Intercity train (ÖBB Eurocity) Munich-Venice: Munich (D) – Rosenheim (D) – Innsbruck (A) – Brenner (A) – Bolzano – Verona – Venice
Night train (ÖBB EuroNight) Vienna-Venice: Vienna (A) – Wiener Neustadt (A) – Sankt-Pölten (A) – Linz (A) – Salzburg (A) – Villach (A) – Udine – Conegliano – Treviso – Venice 
Tourist train (Venice-Simplon Orient Express) Venice-London: Venice – Verona – Innsbruck (A) – Paris (East) (F) – London (Victoria) (GB)

Traffic
The station is used by about 82,000 passengers per day, or a total of around 30 million passengers per annum.

Every day, approximately 450 trains stop at the station.  Long-distance trains use the central platforms, and the regional and suburban platforms are located to the west.

The station is the terminus of several famous trains, including the Venice Simplon Orient Express.

Interchange

Overview
The station is connected with the rest of Venice by the Vaporetto (public water bus) or private water taxi boats.  The nearby Piazzale Roma is the departure point for all car services and taxis for the mainland.

Vaporetto lines in the transit station
The stop (dock) is called Ferrovia and is served by eight ACTV Vaporetto lines:

 1   P.le Roma – Ferrovia – Rialto – San Marco – Lido
 2  San Zaccaria – Giudecca – Tronchetto – P.le Roma – Ferrovia – Rialto – San Marco – (Lido)
 4.1 Murano – F.te Nove – Ferrovia – P.le Roma – Giudecca – San Zaccaria – F.te Nove – Murano
 4.2  Murano – F.te Nove – San Zaccaria – Giudecca – P.le Roma – Ferrovia – F.te Nove – Murano
 5.1  Lido – F.te Nove – Ferrovia – P.le Roma – San Zaccaria – Lido
 5.2  Lido – San Zaccaria – P.le Roma – Ferrovia – F.te Nove – Lido
 3    Murano – Ferrovia – P.le Roma (direct line)
 N  San Zaccaria – Giudecca – Tronchetto – P.le Roma – Ferrovia – Rialto – San Marco – Lido (night line)

See also

History of rail transport in Italy
List of railway stations in Veneto
Rail transport in Italy
Railway stations in Italy

References

External links

"Grandi Stazioni SpA" official website 
Stazioni del Mondo – Description and images of Venezia Santa Lucia station 

Transport in Venice
Railway stations in Veneto
Buildings and structures in Venice
Railway stations opened in 1861
1861 establishments in Italy
Railway stations in Italy opened in the 19th century